Two ships of the Royal Australian Navy have been named HMAS Air Hope.

  an air-sea rescue boat
 HMAS Air Hope (913) an air-sea rescue boat renamed 

Royal Australian Navy ship names